Marshall Caifano (born Marcello Giuseppe Caifano; July 19, 1911 – September 6, 2003) was an Italian-American mobster who became a high-ranking member of the Chicago Outfit in Las Vegas.

Early career
Caifano was born on July 19, 1911, in Sicily, and immigrated to Chicago in the 1920s where he became affiliated with the Chicago Outfit and mobster Paul Ricca. Caifano was a boxer in his youth. In the 1940s, Caifano was sent to Los Angeles. According to author Gus Russo, Bugsy Siegel, who was building a gambling establishment in Las Vegas, was at Virginia Hill's Beverly Hills home with Caifano associate Alan Smiley when another man arrived; Siegel was shot to death, and soon after Gus Greenbaum, the Chicago Outfit's chief bookie, arrived at Siegel's Flamingo Hotel in Las Vegas and said, "We're taking over." In 1943, Nick Circella, Caifano's associate, was tried for extortion of his girlfriend, Estelle Cary who was about to testify against him until her burned and stabbed body was later found. Caifano was suspected of the murder, but the case was never solved; he was also suspected of several other unsolved killings, including the 1950 murder of former Chicago Police Lt. William Drury, the 1952 strangulation of mobster "Russian Louie" Strauss and the 1973 shotgun killing of police officer Richard Cain. In the 1950s, the Outfit moved in on the business of black mobster Theodore Roe, and tried to kidnap him, but Roe killed Caifano's brother during the botched kidnapping attempt in 1951. Roe was tried and pleaded self-defense, but a year later, Roe was shot to death; Caifano and Giancana were questioned but never charged.

Prison and death
In 1964, Caifano was convicted of extorting $60,000 from oilman Ray Ryan, who testified against him. The conviction was upheld in 1966, and Caifano was sentenced to 10 years in prison. Caifano was sentenced to a further 12 years in prison, in 1967, for defrauding a lumber dealer of $42,000. When Caifano was released from prison in the 1970s, Ryan reportedly offered him $1 million in restitution, however, in 1977, Ryan was killed in a car bomb; no one was charged in the murder. In 1980 Caifano was sentenced to 20 years for fencing stolen stock certificates.

A few years after Caifano was released from prison, he died of natural causes on September 6, 2003.

References

Further reading
 Bernstein, Lee. The Greatest Menace: Organized Crime in Cold War America. Boston: UMass Press, 2002. 
 Giancana, Sam and Chuck. Double Cross: The Explosive, Inside Story of the Mobster Who Controlled America. New York: Warner Books, 1992. 
 Ovid, Demaris. Captive City: Chicago in Chains. New York: Lyle Stuart, 1969.
 Reid, Ed. The Grim Reapers, The Anatomy of Organized Crime in America. Chicago: Henry Regnery, 1969.
 Reid, Ed and Demaris, Ovid. The Green Felt Jungle. Montreal: Pocket Books, 1964.
 Zuckerman, Michael J. Vengeance is Mine. New York: Macmillan, 1987.
 Fox, Stephen. Blood and Power: Organized Crime in Twentieth-Century America. New York: William Morrow and Company, 1989. 
 Kelly, Robert J. Encyclopedia of Organized Crime in the United States. Westport, Connecticut: Greenwood Press, 2000. 
 Roemer, William F. Jr. The Enforcer- Spilotro: The Chicago Mob's Man Over Las Vegas. New York: Ivy Books 
 Sifakis, Carl. The Mafia Encyclopedia. New York: Da Capo Press, 2005. 
 Sifakis, Carl. The Encyclopedia of American Crime. New York: Facts on File Inc., 2001. 

1911 births
2003 deaths
American gangsters of Sicilian descent
Chicago Outfit mobsters
Mafia hitmen
Mafia extortionists
American people convicted of fraud
Italian emigrants to the United States